Aleksei Leonidovich Sereda (born February 12, 1966) is a Russian professional football coach and a former player. As a player, he made his debut in the Soviet Second League in 1982 for FC Torpedo Taganrog. He played 2 games in the UEFA Cup 1991–92 for FC Dynamo Moscow.

Honours
 Soviet Top League bronze: 1990.

References

1966 births
Sportspeople from Taganrog
Living people
Soviet footballers
Russian footballers
Association football midfielders
FC SKA Rostov-on-Don players
FC Dynamo Moscow players
FC Rostov players
FC Lada-Tolyatti players
FC Elista players
Russian football managers
FC Taganrog players
Soviet Top League players
Russian Premier League players
FC Volga Ulyanovsk players